The Heuer Well House/Water Tank, located northeast of Jerome, Idaho, is a lava rock house with joined water tank which was built in 1929 by stonemason H.T. Pugh and Ed Bennett.  It was listed on the National Register of Historic Places in 1983.

References

Houses on the National Register of Historic Places in Idaho
Buildings and structures completed in 1929
Jerome County, Idaho
Lava rock buildings and structures
Water tanks on the National Register of Historic Places